Abri is a rock shelter.

Abri may also refer to:
 Abri, Sudan, a small town in northern Sudan
 Abri (tribe)

ABRI may refer to:
 Architecture and Building Research Institute, a research institute in Taiwan
 Indonesian National Armed Forces, the armed forces of Indonesia

See also 
 James Abree, an 18th-century English printer, publisher, and bookseller
 Avri, a given name
 Abris, an early Christian saint